Anthracocarpon is a genus of lichen-forming fungi in the family Verrucariaceae. The genus was circumscribed by Austrian lichenologist Othmar Breuss in 1996 with Anthracocarpon virescens assigned as the type species.

References

Verrucariales
Eurotiomycetes genera
Lichen genera
Taxa described in 1996